Koiva is a village in Valga Parish, Valga County, in southern Estonia.

References

 

Villages in Valga County